Sebastiania bahiensis is a species of flowering plant in the family Euphorbiaceae. It was originally described as Gymnanthes bahiensis Müll.Arg in 1863. It is native to Bahia, Brazil.

References

Plants described in 1863
Flora of Brazil
bahiensis